Aircrack-ng is a network software suite consisting of a detector, packet sniffer, WEP and WPA/WPA2-PSK cracker and analysis tool for 802.11 wireless LANs. It works with any wireless network interface controller whose driver supports raw monitoring mode and can sniff 802.11a, 802.11b and 802.11g traffic. The program runs under Linux, FreeBSD, macOS, OpenBSD, and Windows; the Linux version is packaged for OpenWrt and has also been ported to the Android, Zaurus PDA and Maemo platforms; and a proof of concept port has been made to the iPhone.

In April 2007 a team at the Darmstadt University of Technology in Germany developed a new attack method based on a paper released on the RC4 cipher by Adi Shamir. This new attack, named 'PTW', decreases the number of initialization vectors or IVs needed to decrypt a WEP key and has been included in the aircrack-ng suite since the 0.9 release.

Aircrack-ng is a fork of the original Aircrack project. It can be found as a preinstalled tool in many security-focused Linux distributions such as Kali Linux or Parrot, which share common attributes as they are developed under the same project (Debian).

Features 

The aircrack-ng software suite includes:

See also 

 SpoonWEP/WPA
 Kali Linux (Linux distribution for digital forensics and penetration testing)
 BackTrack, its predecessor 
 TCP sequence prediction attack

References

External links 
 

Network analyzers
Free security software
Cryptanalytic software
Cryptographic attacks
Password cracking software